Asmalıdere is a village in the Susurluk district of Balıkesir province in Turkey.

References

Villages in Susurluk District